Owen County is a county located in the northern part of the U.S. state of Kentucky. Its county seat is Owenton. The county is named for Colonel Abraham Owen. It is a prohibition or dry county, with the exception of a winery that is authorized to sell its product to the public, and limited sales within the incorporated city limits of Owenton.

History

Numerous Native American burial mounds were located in Owen County. Many pioneers made their homes on land grants along the many streams which flow through the county.

Owen County was formed as the 63rd county by the Commonwealth of Kentucky and approved February 6, 1819. It was formed from the counties of Franklin, Scott, Gallatin, and Pendleton. Hesler (Heslerville) was the first county seat. Owen County was named after Abraham Owen, an Indian fighter and Kentucky legislator, who was killed at the Battle of Tippecanoe. Colonel Owen also surveyed and mapped the region that became Owen County. On November 16, 1820, the legislature passed another act which restored to Franklin County part or all of what was taken from it under the 1819 act. To compensate for this, the legislature took some more land from Gallatin County and gave it to Owen by act dated December 26, 1820. Therefore, Hesler was no longer in the center of the county. Accordingly, on January 15, 1822, the county court ordered that the seat of justice be removed to land owned by Andrew Parker, James Hess, and William H. Forsee. The town Owenton was developed. Court was held at the new county seat on February 11, 1822.

In 1844, after Kentucky began to construct locks and dams on the Kentucky River, packet boats on regular trips between Frankfort and Louisville made stops in Owen County at Monterey, Moxley, Gratz, and other towns. New Liberty was founded before 1800 and was the site of one of the first churches.

In the 1870s, Owen County saw Deputy U.S. Marshall Willis Russell struggle to suppress the local Ku Klux Klan chapter, which was committing violence against former slaves in the years during Reconstruction. Russell was murdered by an unknown assassin in 1875.

Geography

Adjacent counties
 Carroll County  (northwest)
 Gallatin County  (northeast)
 Grant County  (east)
 Scott County  (southeast)
 Franklin County  (southwest)
 Henry County  (west)

Demographics

As of the census of 2010, there were 10,841 people, 4,296 households, and 3,023 families residing in the county. The racial makeup of the county was 96.6% White, 0.8% Black or African American, 0.2% Native American, 0.2% Asian, 1.2% from other races, and 1.0% from two or more races. 2.5% of the population were Hispanic or Latino of any race.

There were 4,296 households, out of which 28.8% had children under the age of 18 living with them, 55.4% were married couples living together, 9.2% had a female householder with no husband present, and 29.6% were non-families. 25.3% of all households were made up of individuals, and 10.50% had someone living alone who was 65 years of age or older. The average household size was 2.52 and the average family size was 3.00.

The age distribution was 21.9% under the age of 18, 5.0% from 20 to 24, 29.4% from 25 to 44, 29.0% from 45 to 64, and 14.5% who were 65 years of age or older. The median age was 40.1 years. The population distribution for males was 49.7% and for females was 50.3%.

The median income for a household in the county was $41,719 and the median income for a family was $59,242. Males had a median income of $41,563 versus $31,016 for females. The per capita income for the county was $22,633. About 12.8% of families and 15.9% of the population were below the poverty line, including 22.4% of those under age 18 and 13.90% of those age 65 or over.

Libraries
Located in downtown Owenton, the Owen County Public Library was established in 1946 by the Owen County Woman's Club.  It was housed in the front parlor of Elizabeth Holbrook Thomas's home on the same corner where the present library, built in 1973, now stands.

The library's collection comprises more than 25,000 items, including a genealogy collection.  Among the services it provides are printing, fax sending, notaries, and access to a public meeting room.

Currently this library changed to a center for the elderly when the county build a new library on the outskirts of the city of Owenton

Communities

Cities
 Glencoe
 Gratz
 Monterey
 Owenton (county seat)

Unincorporated communities

 Hesler
 Long Ridge
 Lusby's Mill
 New Columbus
 New Liberty
 Perry Park
 Pleasant Home
 Squiresville
 Wheatley

 Jonesville kentucky

In popular culture
Owen County serves as the opening setting in the 1992 Paul Russell novel Boys of Life where it is referred to simply as Owen.  The majority of the novel is set in the early 1980s New York City. Points of interest within Owen and nearby areas such as Christian County are mentioned and referenced throughout the story.

Politics

See also
 National Register of Historic Places listings in Owen County, Kentucky

References

External links
 Northern Kentucky Views - Owen County Historical Images and Documents

 
Kentucky counties
1819 establishments in Kentucky
Populated places established in 1819